Winmar is a surname. Notable people with the surname include:

 Dallas Winmar, Australian playwright
 Nicholas Winmar (born 1991), Australian rules footballer
 Nicky Winmar (born 1965), Australian rules footballer